Tonyn was a French vessel launched in 1777 under another name and taken in prize circa 1782. She first appeared in the 1782 volume of Lloyd's Register (LR). 

Lloyd's List reported in November 1783 that Tonyn, Welch, master, had been lost on the bar at Saint Augustine, Florida. She had been on a voyage from Charles Town, South Carolina, to Saint Augustine and London. The LR volume for 1783 carried the annotation "Lost" by her name.

Citations

1777 ships
Ships built in France
Captured ships
Age of Sail merchant ships of England
Maritime incidents in 1783